Loftus Dudley Ward, (November 7, 1905 – May 24, 1980), of Calgary, Alberta, was a Chief Petty Officer in the Royal Canadian Navy.

Ward was elected to the Legislative Assembly of Alberta in the 1944/45 general election. He was one of three members of the armed forces elected that year; these three members did not represent a specific constituency but instead spoke for the men and women serving overseas in the Second World War, each of them representing a different branch of the service (army, navy, and air force). They had no political affiliation and sat on the opposition side of the House. Ward was the representative of the Naval Forces.

External links
Legislative Assembly of Alberta Members Listing 

1905 births
1980 deaths
Independent Alberta MLAs
Canadian military personnel of World War II